To date, the South Korean girl group Twice has released 173 songs, of which 122 are originally recorded in Korean, 44 are in Japanese, and 7 are in English. In addition, the group has released 2 official covers of "I Want You Back" and "I Love You More Than Anyone".



Recorded songs

Notes

References 

Twice